Johan (Juho) Emil Sunila (16 August 1875 – 2 October 1936) was a Finnish politician from the Agrarian League, the managing director of the agrarian finance board, and Prime Minister of Finland in two cabinets. He was born in Liminka.

After Santeri Alkio had withdrawn from the Parliament of Finland in 1922, Sunila became, in addition to Kyösti Kallio, the second of the Agrarian Party's strong members in the 1920s. Supported by the agrarian-background governor of the province of Viipuri and the President of Finland Lauri Kristian Relander, he supported productive agrarianism, where the attention of politics was concentrated mainly on making agrarianism more effective instead of widespread improvement of the countryside.

Sunila's first cabinet lasted from December 1927 to December 1928 and his second cabinet lasted from March 1931 to December 1932. Before this, Sunila had served as Minister of Agriculture in two of Kyösti Kallio's cabinets and Antti Tulenheimo's cabinet.

Sunila died in Helsinki, aged 61.

Cabinets
 Sunila I Cabinet
 Sunila II Cabinet

References

1875 births
1936 deaths
People from Liminka
People from Oulu Province (Grand Duchy of Finland)
Centre Party (Finland) politicians
Prime Ministers of Finland
Speakers of the Parliament of Finland
Members of the Parliament of Finland (1922–24)
Members of the Parliament of Finland (1924–27)
Members of the Parliament of Finland (1929–30)
Members of the Parliament of Finland (1930–33)
University of Helsinki alumni
Academic staff of the University of Helsinki